Shahida Rahman Josna is a Bangladesh Nationalist Party politician from Rangpur District, who was a Member of Parliament for the reserved women's seat.

Early life 
Josna was born in Rangpur District.

Career 
Josna is a member of the National Executive Committee of Bangladesh Nationalist Party and the president of the Rangpur District unit of Jatiyatabadi Mohila Dal. She was a Member of Parliament nominated by the Bangladesh Nationalist Party from the women's seat 3 of the Sixth Jatiya Sangshad.

References 

6th Jatiya Sangsad members
Bangladesh Nationalist Party politicians
Year of birth missing (living people)
Living people
People from Rangpur District
Women members of the Jatiya Sangsad